Shabir Isoufi (born 9 March 1992) is an Afghan football coach and former player who works as an assistant coach for the Afghanistan national team.

He played for Dutch clubs Feyenoord, Excelsior, Dordrecht, Telstar, Barendrecht, ASWH and SC Feyenoord as a midfielder, and also represented Afghanistan at international level.

Playing career

Club career
Isoufi played club football in the Netherlands for Feyenoord, Excelsior, Dordrecht, Telstar and Barendrecht. In June 2015 Shabir signed a contract with Hoofdklasse club ASWH. He moved to SC Feyenoord for the 2017–18 season.

International career
He made three appearances for the Netherlands at the 2009 FIFA U-17 World Cup.

He earned seven caps for the Afghanistan senior team in 2015, scoring once.

International goals

Coaching career
Isoufi graduated with his UEFA B diploma on 22 May 2018. After gaining his diploma, Isoufi was appointed as the assistant coach of the Afghan national football team.

Personal life
In 2011, Isoufi was the highest paid athlete from Afghanistan with an annual salary of $80,000 (USD).

References

1992 births
Living people
Sportspeople from Kandahar
Afghan footballers
Afghanistan international footballers
Dutch footballers
Netherlands youth international footballers
Afghan emigrants to the Netherlands
Afghan expatriate sportspeople in the Netherlands
Association football midfielders
Feyenoord players
Excelsior Rotterdam players
FC Dordrecht players
SC Telstar players
BVV Barendrecht players
Eerste Divisie players
Eredivisie players
Derde Divisie players
ASWH players
SC Feyenoord players
Afghan football managers